The 1931–32 Challenge Cup was the 32nd staging of rugby league's oldest knockout competition, the Challenge Cup.

First round

Second round

Quarterfinals

Semifinals

Final

References

Challenge Cup
Challenge Cup